As of the opening of the Guryak Truck Bridge in February 2009 there were three bridges crossing the Kunar River in Kunar Province.
The Konar Provincial Reconstruction Team is working on four additional new bridges.
The bridges are designed to last sixty years.
According to Lieutenant Neil Myers USN, of the Kunar Provincial Reconstruction Team the popularity of the bridges stopped insurgents from attacking the bridges.

{| class="wikitable"
|+ Bridges in Konar Province
|-
! completed || name || location || notes
|-
| || Nawabad Bridge || Nawabad ||
 Built prior to the 2001 invasion.
 Crosses the Kunar River.
 Road approaches paved in 2009.
|-
| || || Asmar ||
 Built prior to the 2001 invasion.
 Crosses the Kunar River.
 The 1911 edition of the Encyclopædia Britannica says a bridge spanned the river at Asmar.
|-
| || Senji Bridge
|-
| 2006-09-18 || Pesh Bridge || FOB Ghazni ||
 Completed in just one month.
|-
| 2008-02-00 || Matin Bridge || Pesh valley ||
 Old bridge was washed away in a flood in 2007.
|-
| 2009-02-17 || Guryak Truck Bridge || Chapadara district
|-
| 2009-x-x || Khas Konar Truck Bridge || Khas Konar ||
|-
| 2009-x-x || Marawara Truck Bridge || Marawara District ||
|-
| 2009-x-x || Bar Sholtan Truck Bridge || Shigal District ||
|-
| 2009-x-x || Saw Truck Bridge || Gaziabad District ||
|}

References

Konar
Kunar Province